Chemor (Jawi: چيمور) is a main town in Kinta District, Perak, Malaysia. Chemor railway station was demolished in 2012.

Kinta District
Towns in Perak